MTV Animation is the animation department of the television network MTV.

History 
In 1991, MTV debuted its first full-length animated series, Liquid Television, which helped launch Beavis and Butt-Head and Æon Flux. MTV established its own in-house animation studio in 1993 to work on Beavis and Butt-Head and other projects. While MTV department is often grouped with that of Nickelodeon's, the two entities are completely separate. Most of MTV's cartoons are known for their dark humor, sexual jokes, graphic violence, pop culture references, and irreverence.

In an interview for the Beavis and Butt-Head Do America DVD, Mike Judge described MTV Animation as being very ad hoc: Beavis and Butt-Head didn't have an art director until the film was made, so until the film they'd never considered colour palettes from scene to scene. In the same interview, art director Yvette Kaplan said "everything was overlapping... we never had the luxury of one part [episode] finished" before another episode was finished.

Many MTV animation productions do not survive a single season and in some cases are canceled before completion. Productions including Undergrads, Downtown, Station Zero, 3-South, and Clone High have been highly acclaimed, yet none of them got renewed beyond their first season, usually due to lack of an audience or advertising. By 2001, the animation department was shut down, with the network's animated series now being outsourced to different studios. During the 2000s, MTV would phase out of producing original animation in favor of importing shows, usually reruns of shows from sister networks Comedy Central and Nickelodeon. The MTV Animation brand was briefly revived from 2006 to 2007 as part of a push to produce animated series for MTV2.

In 2011, MTV would return to adult animation. Its first production was a relaunch of Beavis and Butt-Head, which premiered in October 2011; this was quickly followed by Good Vibes, starting later in the same month. In November 2011, MTV said they plan a third cartoon, Worst Friends Forever by Thomas Middleditch, that Mike Judge would produce, about three teenage girls who hover on the outskirts of popularity and have to cope with cattiness and crushes; a pilot had been picked up and concept art of the characters was released. The cartoons did not do as expected though. Good Vibes was cancelled in February 2012 due to low ratings, on the same day the DVD came out, Beavis and Butt-Head was cancelled in December 2011, and Worst Friends Forever never aired. In a September 2012 interview on "Making It With Riki Lindhome", Middleditch said Worst Friends was "for all intents and purposes done" and "not in my hands anymore". Mike Judge said in January 2014 that he might pitch Beavis and Butt-Head to another network.

Future and possible resurgence 
In August 2020, ViacomCBS's Entertainment & Youth Group launched a new strategy to expand its adult animation units. This upcoming unit will produce various animated shows under the revitalized MTV Entertainment Group. Plans for Beavis and Butt-Head (reboot) and Daria (spinoff) have been announced for Comedy Central (and Paramount+). MTV Animation Inc. remains a subsidiary of Paramount Global.

Productions

Television series 

Other MTV animated series

Theatrical films

Streaming service original films

Television films

References 

MTV
Television production companies of the United States
American animation studios
Adult animation studios
1993 establishments in New York (state)
Film production companies of the United States
Animation studios owned by Paramount Global